Belleville is a neighbourhood of Bouaké, Ivory Coast. Administratively, it is in the sub-prefecture of Bouaké-Ville, Bouaké Department, Gbêkê Region, Vallée du Bandama District.

Belleville was a commune until March 2012, when it became one of 1126 communes nationwide that were abolished.

Notes

Bouaké
Former communes of Ivory Coast